Petrovija is a village in Umag municipality in Istria County, Croatia.
At the 2011 census its population was 461.

References

Populated places in Istria County